Buena Vista is an unincorporated community in Green Township, Fayette County, Ohio, United States. Rattlesnake Creek flows near the town site.

History
Buena Vista had its start in the 1830s. Buena Vista was formerly called Moons, after William Moon, an early settler. The present name is said to be a transfer from Buena Vista, Virginia.

A post office called Moon was established in 1833, and remained in operation until 1907.

References 

Unincorporated communities in Fayette County, Ohio
Unincorporated communities in Ohio